NGC 298 is a spiral galaxy in the constellation Cetus. It was discovered on September 27, 1864 by Albert Marth. NGC 298 is situated close to the celestial equator and, as such, it is at least partly visible from both hemispheres in certain times of the year. Given its B magnitude of 14.7, NGC 298 is visible with the help of a telescope having an aperture of 20 inches (500 millimetre) or more.

References

External links
 

0298
18640927
Cetus (constellation)
Spiral galaxies